This is a list of all episodes of The NBC Mystery Movie.

Wednesday Mystery Movie (1971–72)

Wednesday Mystery Movie/Sunday Mystery Movie (1972–73)

Sunday Mystery Movie/Wednesday Mystery Movie/Tuesday Mystery Movie (1973–74)

Sunday Mystery Movie (1974–75)

Sunday Mystery Movie (1975–76)

Sunday Mystery Movie (1976–77)

See also
Columbo
McCloud
McMillan & Wife
Hec Ramsey
Madigan
Cool Million
Banacek
Tenafly
Faraday & Company
The Snoop Sisters
Amy Prentiss
McCoy
Quincy, M.E.
Lanigan's Rabbi

Lists of mystery television series episodes